KRMN (89.3 FM) was a radio station licensed to serve the community of Mena, Arkansas. The station was owned by University of Arkansas Rich Mountain and aired an variety format.

The station was assigned the KRMN call letters by the Federal Communications Commission on March 22, 2010.

The station discontinued its operations on January 31, 2020, and surrendered its license to the Federal Communications Commission on February 11, 2020. The FCC canceled KRMN's license on February 12, 2020.

References

External links
 

RMN (FM)
Radio stations established in 2011
2011 establishments in Arkansas
Polk County, Arkansas
Defunct radio stations in the United States
Radio stations disestablished in 2020
2020 disestablishments in Arkansas
RMN (FM)